Tjörn is the sixth largest island in Sweden, located on the Swedish West coast in the province of Bohuslän.

The population, as of 2017, was 15,774 people.

Geography

Tjörn is connected in the east to the town of Stenungsund on the mainland by the Tjörn Bridge, and to the island of Orust in the north by the Skåpesund bridge.

The largest town is Skärhamn, and it is also the municipal capital. Other communities, many of which are fishing communities, include Rönnäng, Klädesholmen, and Kyrkesund. The peninsula of Mjörn has large shell banks.

Climate
Tjörn has a maritime climate influenced by its location off the coastline. Even so, the proximity to the mainland means that the weather station of Rörastrand more resembles a mainland coastal climate than one of the archipelago.

Tourism
During the summer, the population swells from 15,000 to 45,000 as vacationers arrive for yachting and swimming. Skärhamn has a guest harbor to accommodate yachters travelling along the Swedish west coast.

See also
Tjörn Municipality
Tjörn Hundred

References

External links 

Islands on the Swedish West Coast
Islands of Västra Götaland County